Frederic Mosley Sackett (December 17, 1868May 18, 1941) served as a United States senator from Kentucky and ambassador to Germany during the Hoover Administration.

Early life
He was born in Providence, Rhode Island.  His father, also named Frederic Moseley, was a Civil War veteran and wealthy wools manufacturer.

He attended the public schools in Providence.  He graduated from Brown University in 1890 and Harvard Law School in 1893.

Legal career
He was admitted to the bar in 1893 and began practice in Columbus, Ohio. Shortly after he moved to Cincinnati, Ohio and then to Louisville, Kentucky.  He practiced law until 1907.

In 1898 he married Olive Speed, the daughter of James Breckenridge Speed, who was part of a wealthy and prominent Kentucky family.

Although he began as an attorney, he gradually became involved in his wife's family business, the mining of coal and the manufacture of cement. He served as president of the Louisville Gas Co. and of the Louisville Lighting Co. from 1907 to 1912. He was involved with the Board of Trade of Louisville, serving as president in 1917, 1922, and 1923.  He was also director of the Louisville Branch of the Federal Reserve Bank from 1917 to 1924. During the First World War, he served as federal food administrator for Kentucky from 1917 to 1919. This led to a friendship with the directory of the national food administrator, Herbert Hoover. Afterwards he was a member of the Kentucky State Board of Charities and Corrections from 1919 to 1924.

Senator
He was elected as a Republican to the United States Senate in 1924 and served from March 4, 1925 to January 9, 1930, when he resigned, having been appointed Ambassador to Germany by President Herbert Hoover. He served from 1930 to 1933, when he resigned.  Afterwards, he resumed his former business activities. He died of a heart attack while visiting Baltimore, and is buried in Cave Hill Cemetery, Louisville.

References

Burke, Bernard V. Ambassador Frederic Sackett and the Collapse of the Weimar Republic from 1930 to 1933 Cambridge University Press, 1994.

1868 births
1941 deaths
People from Providence, Rhode Island
Republican Party United States senators from Kentucky
Kentucky Republicans
Ambassadors of the United States to Germany
Federal Reserve System
Politicians from Louisville, Kentucky
Brown University alumni
Harvard Law School alumni
Burials at Cave Hill Cemetery
20th-century American diplomats